Gurbinder Singh Cheema (born ) is a British male weightlifter, competing in the 105 kg category and representing Great Britain and England at international competitions. He competed at world championships, most recently at the 2001 World Weightlifting Championships. He represented England at the 2002, 2006 and 2010 Commonwealth Games.

Major results

References

1978 births
Living people
British male weightlifters
Place of birth missing (living people)
Weightlifters at the 2002 Commonwealth Games
Weightlifters at the 2006 Commonwealth Games
Weightlifters at the 2010 Commonwealth Games
Commonwealth Games medallists in weightlifting
Commonwealth Games bronze medallists for England
English male weightlifters
20th-century British people
21st-century British people
Medallists at the 2002 Commonwealth Games